|}

The Pat Eddery Stakes is a Listed flat horse race in Great Britain open to two-year-old horses. It is run at Ascot over a distance of 7 furlongs (1,408 metres), and it is scheduled to take place each year in July.

The event was originally named the Winkfield Stakes after Winkfield, a village located to the north of Ascot. It was established in 2006, and the inaugural running was won by Satulagi. It was permanently renamed in 2016 to honour Pat Eddery, an 11-time British Champion flat jockeys jockey who died in 2015.

The Pat Eddery Stakes is held at the same meeting as the King George VI and Queen Elizabeth Stakes.

Records
Leading jockey (3 wins):
 William Buick -  Sixth Sense (2015), New Science (2021), Naval Power (2022) 

Leading trainer (3 wins):
 Charlie Appleby -  Al Dabaran (2019), New Science (2021),Naval Power (2022)

Winners

See also
 Horse racing in Great Britain
 List of British flat horse races

References

 Racing Post:

pedigreequery.com – Winkfield Stakes – Ascot.

Flat races in Great Britain
Ascot Racecourse
Flat horse races for two-year-olds
Recurring sporting events established in 2006
2006 establishments in England